Liang Caixia (born September 20, 1981 in Xinhui, Jiangmen, Guangdong) is a Chinese modern pentathlete who competed at the 2004 Summer Olympics.

She finished 29th in the women's competition.

External links
 Yahoo Sports profile

1981 births
Living people
Chinese female modern pentathletes
Modern pentathletes at the 2004 Summer Olympics
Olympic modern pentathletes of China
People from Xinhui District
Sportspeople from Guangdong
Asian Games medalists in modern pentathlon
Modern pentathletes at the 2002 Asian Games
Asian Games silver medalists for China
Medalists at the 2002 Asian Games
20th-century Chinese women
21st-century Chinese women